Barleria is a genus of plants in the family Acanthaceae.

Some species include:
 Barleria acanthoides Vahl
 Barleria aculeata Balf.f.
 Barleria albostellata C.B.Clarke, the grey barleria
 Barleria compacta Malombe & I.Darbysh.
 Barleria cristata L., the crested Philippine violet
 Barleria elegans S.Moore
 Barleria greenii M.&K.Balkwill, Green's barleria
 Barleria lupulina Lindl., the hop-headed barleria or snake bush
 Barleria micans Nees
 Barleria mysorensis B.Heyne ex Roth
 Barleria observatrix Bosser & Heine
 Barleria obtusa Nees, the bush violet
 Barleria opaca (Vahl) Nees
 Barleria popovii Verdc.
 Barleria pretoriensis C.B.Clarke
 Barleria prionitis L., the porcupine flower
 Barleria repens Nees, the small bush violet
 Barleria rotundifolia Oberm.
 Barleria siamensis Craib
 Barleria strigosa Willd.
 Barleria tetracantha Balf.f.

External links
 
 
 

 
Acanthaceae genera